The Asian Film Award for Best Costume Design is one of the Asian Film Awards, starting in 2010 in its fourth edition. It has been awarded annually by the Hong Kong International Film Festival Society, and later by the Asian Film Awards Academy, starting in 2013.

Winners and nominees
Winners are listed first and highlighted in bold.

References

External links
 

Asian Film Awards